Edwin Nicholas Weiland (November 26, 1914 – July 12, 1971) was a Major League Baseball pitcher who played for two seasons. He pitched for the Chicago White Sox for five games during the 1940 Chicago White Sox season and 1942 Chicago White Sox season. He served in the military during World War II.

External links

1914 births
1971 deaths
Major League Baseball pitchers
Baseball players from Illinois
Chicago White Sox players
Sportspeople from Evanston, Illinois